This is a list of NUTS2 statistical regions of Finland by Human Development Index as of 2021.

References 

Human Development Index
Finland
Finland